David Crow is the name of:

David Crow (entrepreneur), contributor to The Mark News
David Crow (musician) with Osborne Brothers
David Crow, commander of USS Vencedor

See also
David Crowe (disambiguation)
John David Crow (1935–2015), American football player, coach, and college athletics administrator